Home of the Brave is an American old-time radio serial drama. It was broadcast on CBS beginning on January 6, 1941. On April 28, 1941, it switched to NBC-Red, where it remained until the series ended on September 19, 1941.

Format
Set in New Chance, Colorado, Home of the Brave focused on Joe, a telephone lineman, and the girl whom he loved.

The 15-minute program was sponsored by Calumet Baking Powder and Swansdown Cake Flour.

Personnel
The show's characters and the actors who portrayed them are shown in the table below.

Source: Radio Programs, 1924-1984: A Catalog of More Than 1800 Shows

References 
 

1941 radio programme debuts
1941 radio programme endings
1940s American radio programs
CBS Radio programs
NBC radio programs
American radio dramas
American radio soap operas